= Basidoni =

Coordinates: 15°51′N 75°14′E

- Village
- Interactive map of Basidoni
- Country: India
- State: Karnataka
- District: Belgaum

Languages
  - Official: Kannada
- Time zone: UTC+5:30 (IST)

Basidoni is a village in Belgaum district in the southern state of Karnataka, India.
